Lucius Cassius Longinus (c. 151 – 107 BC) was consul of the Roman Republic in 107 BC. His colleague was Gaius Marius, then serving the first of his seven consulships.

He was probably the eldest son of Lucius Cassius Longinus Ravilla, consul in 127 BC, who had presided over the trial of several Vestal Virgins who had been charged with unchastity.

As praetor in 111 BC, he was sent to Numidia to bring Jugurtha to Rome to testify in corruption trials, promising him safe passage. Jugurtha valued this pledge as much as the public pledge for his safety. In 108, he came first in the polls and was elected senior consul for 107, with Gaius Marius (who came in second) as his junior colleague. He was assigned to Gaul to oppose the migration of a confederation of Germanic tribes (mainly Cimbri and Teutones). He was killed in an ambush at the Battle of Burdigala, in modern-day Bordeaux, along with 10,000 of his legionaries. After his death, the remains of his army under Gaius Popillius Laenas passed under the yoke, gave up half of their belongings, and returned to Rome.

The massacre of Longinus and his army was one of the reasons given by Julius Caesar in De Bello Gallico for why he denied the Helvetii the freedom to migrate through Roman territory in 58 BC.

References 

 

150s BC births
107 BC deaths
2nd-century BC Roman consuls
2nd-century BC Roman generals
2nd-century BC Roman praetors
Longinus, Lucius consul 647 AUC
People of the Cimbrian War
Roman consuls who died in office
Roman generals killed in action
Year of birth unknown